Schlangenbach is a small river in Bavaria, Germany. It is a right tributary of the Altmühl near Gunzenhausen.

See also
List of rivers of Bavaria

Rivers of Bavaria
Weißenburg-Gunzenhausen
Rivers of Germany